The 1947 Duquesne Dukes football team was an American football team that represented Duquesne University in the 1947 college football season. In its first season under head coach Kass Kovalcheck, the team compiled a 2–8 record and was outscored by a total of 262 to 45.  The team played its home games at Forbes Field in Pittsburgh.

Schedule

References

Duquesne
Duquesne Dukes football seasons
Duquesne Dukes football